Kassio Fernandes Magalhães (born 11 February 1987) is a former Brazilian centre back.

Career
In March 2012, Kassio signed for Chinese Super League team Changchun Yatai.

Career statistics

Honours

Club
Hapoel Kiryat Shmona
Israel State Cup: 2013–14
Israel Super Cup: 2015

References

External links
Kassio Fernandes Magalhães Profile at ogol.com.br

1987 births
Living people
Brazilian footballers
Canoas Sport Club players
AEK Larnaca FC players
Ethnikos Achna FC players
Changchun Yatai F.C. players
Hapoel Ironi Kiryat Shmona F.C. players
Maccabi Ahi Nazareth F.C. players
U.D. Vilafranquense players
Cypriot First Division players
Chinese Super League players
Israeli Premier League players
Liga Leumit players
Liga Portugal 2 players
Association football defenders
Brazilian expatriate footballers
Expatriate footballers in Cyprus
Expatriate footballers in China
Expatriate footballers in Israel
Expatriate footballers in Portugal
Brazilian expatriate sportspeople in Cyprus
Brazilian expatriate sportspeople in China
Brazilian expatriate sportspeople in Israel
Brazilian expatriate sportspeople in Portugal